Right About Now: The Official Sucka Free Mix CD or simply Right About Now was released by Talib Kweli in November 2005 and is generally considered a mixtape.  However, some people regard this release as an official album because of its availability through commercial sites and its release of two singles.  It also lacks the DJ overlays often accompanied by mixtapes which makes the CD read more like an official album.  This CD is notable because, although a low-key release, it features upcoming members of Kweli's record label, Blacksmith Music. The album sold 16,000 copies in its first week of release, debuting at #113 on the Billboard 200.

The appearance of Mos Def on the track Supreme Supreme is another key point of the album as Talib Kweli and Mos Def had not rapped together on a track since Kweli's Quality album in 2002.  There was some controversy regarding the song "Ms. Hill", (a dedication song to artist Lauryn Hill) which features an uncredited and illegal sample of a Ben Kweller song.

Track listing

Album singles

References

External links

2005 albums
Talib Kweli albums
Albums produced by J Dilla
Albums produced by DJ Khalil
Albums produced by DJ Quik
Albums produced by Needlz
E1 Music albums
Albums produced by 88-Keys